The greater roundleaf bat (Hipposideros camerunensis) is a species of bat in the family Hipposideridae found in Cameroon, the Democratic Republic of the Congo, and Kenya.

References

Hipposideros
Mammals described in 1956
Bats of Africa
Taxonomy articles created by Polbot